The Lobaev sniper rifle is a rifle line of custom-built bolt-action sniper rifles manufactured by Lobaev Arms, which produces benchrest equipment and long-range, sniper and mountain hunting rifles in Tarusa, Russia. The Lobaev rifles are based on a single-shot bolt-action designed for benchrest shooting by Vladislav Lobaev. The chambering, barrel, stock, ammunition feeding method and other rifle characteristics are determined by the clients' preferences.

Variants
Lobaev rifles are offered in two main variants. The first variant is the SVL, СВЛ - Снайперская винтовка Лобаева (Lobaev sniper rifle). The SVL variant has a field quick barrel change feature and the top of the receiver features a Picatinny rail to mount aiming optics. Lobaev SVL sniper rifles are factory guaranteed to have 0.3 MOA accuracy with specific ammunition. With a typical accuracy potential of sub-0.2 MOA at ranges exceeding 2,000 meters, the Lobaev company claims it builds the most accurate long-range sniper rifle in the world.

The second variant is the OVL, ОВЛ - Охотничья винтовка Лобаева (Lobaev hunting rifle). The OVL variant is used among hunters and sportsmen like benchrest shooters, etc.

Other variants of the Lobaev Sniper Rifle include:
 SVLK-14S, SVLK-14M
 DXL, DXL-5 Havoc
 TSVL
 DVL

Users

: The SVL variant chambered for .408 Chey Tac is used by the Federal Protective Service of Russia. The DXL-5 variant chambered for the Russian cartridge 12.7×108mm is used by the Russian Ground Forces.
: Actively purchased by the SOF, Border troops and SOBR.

See also
 List of Russian weaponry
 Sniper equipment

References

External links 

 Невероятное производство в России: Оружие охраны президента (Russian)
 The Russians are coming, Gun Trade July 2010
 LOBAEV ARMS

Bolt-action rifles of Russia
Sniper rifles of Russia
Single-shot bolt-action rifles